Neohermes is a genus of fishflies in the family Corydalidae. There are about 5 described species in Neohermes.

Species
 Neohermes angusticollis (Hagen, 1861)
 Neohermes californicus (Walker, 1853)
 Neohermes concolor (Davis, 1903)
 Neohermes filicornis (Banks, 1903)
 Neohermes matheri Flint, 1965

References

 Flint, Oliver S. Jr. (1965). "The genus Neohermes (Megaloptera: Corydalidae)". Psyche, vol. 72, no. 3, 255-263.
 Penny, Norman D., Philip A. Adams, and Lionel A. Stange (1997). "Species catalog of the Neuroptera, Megaloptera, and Raphidioptera of America North of Mexico". Proceedings of the California Academy of Sciences, vol. 50, no. 3, 39-114.

Further reading

 

Corydalidae